Saint Jerome in Penitence is a c.1575 painting of Saint Jerome by Titian, now in the Nuevos Museos in the El Escorial.

1570s paintings
Religious paintings by Titian
Titian, 1575
Lions in art
Books in art